is a passenger railway station located in the city of Iyo, Ehime Prefecture, Japan. It is operated by JR Shikoku and has the station number "S08".

Lines
Only Yosan Line local trains stop at the station and the eastbound trains stop at Matsuyama. Connections with other services are needed to travel further east of Matsuyama on the line.

Layout
The station consists of two side platforms serving two tracks. A station building, which is unstaffed, serves as a waiting room. The platforms are linked by a level crossing at either end. A siding branches off the track on the side of the station building. Parking is available at the station forecourt. There is a public telephone callbox outside the station building.

History
At that time the station was operated by Japanese Government Railways (JGR), later becoming Japanese National Railways (JNR). With the privatization of JNR on 1 April 1987, control of the station passed to JR Shikoku.

Surrounding area
 Nadamachi Beach
Futami Seaside Park
Museum of the setting sun
 Japan National Route 378

See also
 List of railway stations in Japan

References

External links
Station timetable

Railway stations in Ehime Prefecture
Railway stations in Japan opened in 1932
Iyo, Ehime